Hugo de Souza Nogueira (born 31 January 1999), known as Hugo Souza or even Neneca, is a Brazilian footballer who plays as goalkeeper for Campeonato Brasileiro Série A club Flamengo.

His nickname Neneca is a homage to former Guarani goalkeeper, Hélio Miguel.

Career
Hugo, born in the city of Duque de Caxias, joined the Flamengo youth academy in 2009 at the age of ten. With the youth squad he won two Copa São Paulo de Futebol Júnior (2016 and 2018).

Flamengo
On 27 September 2020, Hugo made his professional debut in a 1–1 draw between Flamengo against Palmeiras, Hugo was selected as Man of the Match.

On 12 January 2023, Hugo Souza transferred to Vissel Kobe on a €1.2m transfer fee, with Flamengo retaining 50% of a future transfer. Although, two days later Hugo withdrew the transfer claiming personal problems.

International career
On 17 August 2018 Brazilian national team manager Tite included Hugo on the 23-man roster for a pair of friendlies against the United States and El Salvador but he did not feature in either match.

On 13 December 2018 Hugo was called up to the 2019 South American U-20 Championship squad for Brazil but did not play.

Career statistics

Club

Honours
Flamengo
Copa Libertadores: 2022
Campeonato Brasileiro Série A: 2019, 2020
Supercopa do Brasil: 2020, 2021
Copa do Brasil: 2022
Campeonato Carioca: 2019, 2020, 2021

References

External links
Flamengo official profile 

1999 births
Living people
People from Duque de Caxias, Rio de Janeiro
Association football goalkeepers
Brazilian footballers
Campeonato Brasileiro Série A players
CR Flamengo footballers
Copa Libertadores-winning players
Brazil under-20 international footballers
Sportspeople from Rio de Janeiro (state)